Morris Albert Lottinger Jr. (born c. 1937), is a retired judge who previously served from 1971 to 1975 as a Democratic member of the Louisiana House of Representatives from his native Houma in Terrebonne Parish in South Louisiana.
 
Lottinger is one of three children born to the former Effie J. Hellier (1908-1993) and the attorney Morris Lottinger Sr.(1902-1978 His paternal grandparents were the former Lucille Theriot and Victor Lottinger (died July 1939). In the 1940 United States Census, then listed as two years of age, Lottinger was residing with his parents and his older sister Elizabeth in the home of his maternal grandfather, Harry W. Hellier (born c. 1880) and his uncle, Harry F. Hellier.

Lottinger received his bachelor's degree from Nicholls State University in Thibodaux in Lafourche Parish. He completed Louisiana State University Law Center and was admitted to the bar in 1965. He is a member of Phi Delta Phi, the international legal honor society.

In the House, Lottinger joined with colleague Elward Thomas Brady Jr., also of Houma, in an effort to adopt boater-safety regulations proposed by the United States Coast Guard, but many constituents objected to the U.S. government dictating policy regarding their boats. Years later, those same safety guidelines were adopted.

In 1976, Representative Lottinger was named "Conservationist of the Year" among the elected official category by the Louisiana Wildlife Federation.

Lottinger left the state House after five years to become a judge of the Louisiana First Circuit Court of Appeal, which includes his Terrebonne Parish. He retired from the judgeship as chief judge on July 15, 1998. Like his father, he was hence both a state representative and a judge. The senior Lottinger was also House Speaker for the last two years of his legislative service.

References

1938 births
Living people
People from Houma, Louisiana
Nicholls State University alumni
Louisiana State University Law Center alumni
Democratic Party members of the Louisiana House of Representatives
Louisiana lawyers
Louisiana state court judges
Catholics from Louisiana